The 1995–96 Copa Federación de España was the third staging of the Copa Federación de España, a knockout competition for Spanish football clubs.

Regional tournaments

Asturias tournament

Castile and León tournament

National competition

Preliminary round

First round

Second round

Semi-finals

Final

References
Results at Eldeportivo.es

Copa Federación de España seasons
Fed
copa